is a Japanese former professional motorcycle racer. He won 43 world championship superbike races during a 25 year racing career, making him one of the most accomplished competitors never to have won a Superbike World Championship. Haga was the runner-up in the championship three times and, four times finished in third place. His 43 victories ranks fourth all time in the history of the Superbike World Championship behind Jonathan Rea, Carl Fogarty and Troy Bayliss. Haga ranks fourth behind Troy Corser, Tom Sykes and Jonathan Rea in career World Superbike race starts with 313. He last competed in the 2018 CIV Supersport 600 Championship, aboard a Yamaha YZF-R6.

Career

Early career
Haga started his racing career by competing in the Japanese Superbike Championship in 1993, riding a Ducati bike. He then moved to Yamaha in 1995, and won the championship with Yamaha in 1997. During his stint with Yamaha in Japanese Superbike, Haga was chosen to represent Yamaha in the 1996 Suzuka 8 Hours endurance race. He teamed up with Yamaha's World Superbike rider Colin Edwards and won the race.

Superbike World Championship
Before Haga began racing full-time in the World Superbike Championship in 1998, he had already been racing occasionally in WSBK since 1994. In , Haga received a wild card entry to race in the Japanese round of WSBK at Sugo. He surprisingly finished second in Race 1, collecting his first podium in WSBK at his first attempt. However, he failed to finish in Race 2. In , while still racing in his home championship, he was given another chance to race in WSBK. He was chosen to replace the injured Colin Edwards for the last two races of the season in Sugo, Japan, and Sentul, Indonesia. He performed well in both rounds, collecting his first win in WSBK along with 2 more podiums.

In , Haga began racing WSBK full-time. He also adopted the number 41 that he has used ever since. Haga joined Yamaha's Superbike team, replacing Colin Edwards who moved to Honda. He started the season brilliantly by winning 3 of the first 4 races. Unfortunately, his performance declined and he dropped out of championship contention. He won another two races in the season and finished 6th in the championship standing. During the year, Haga also received a wild-card entry to the 1998 500cc Japanese Grand Prix at Suzuka. Haga scored an unexpected third place podium in his 500cc debut. This was his only podium in his brief 500cc/MotoGP career.

The following season, Haga finished 7th in the championship. He only managed 1 race win and 1 third-place finish on the new Yamaha YZF-R7. As a result, another Japanese rider, Akira Yanagawa finished 5th, above Haga. This marks the only time Haga was not the highest placed Japanese Rider in every season in which he competed in WSBK.

However, his season was disrupted when he was tested positive for a banned substance. Haga was tested positive for the substance Ephedrine after the race in South Africa, though it was later learned that Ephedrine occurs naturally in the herbs used in the Ephedra supplement that he'd taken during the off-season. He initially received a one-month ban beginning on June 5 and had his points from both South African races deducted. However, after a series of appeals the points from Race 1 in South Africa were reinstated and the ban was delayed and reduced to a 2-week ban, resulting in Haga missing the final round at Brands Hatch, Great Britain. With Haga losing 25 points and sitting out a 2-race weekend, Colin Edwards comfortably won the 2000 championship.

500cc/MotoGP World Championship
After an eventful year, Haga left WSBK and joined the 500cc World Championship for the 2001 season. Haga initially did not want to join the 500cc Championship as he wanted another chance to challenge for the WSBK crown. However, Yamaha had already announced that they were withdrawing from WSBK and focusing on the challenge to win the 500cc Championship. Haga joined the factory-backed Red Bull Yamaha WCM team, riding the Yamaha YZR500. Haga failed to adapt to the new bike and had a disappointing season, without a single podium. He finished fourteenth in the championship.

He had several podium finishes but no wins. He finished 4th in the overall standing, before moving back to MotoGP in the following season. He was joined by his former teammate Colin Edwards to spearhead Aprilia's MotoGP campaign, riding the newly developed Aprilia RS Cube. Both Haga and Edwards endured another disappointing season with the RS Cube performing poorly. Haga once again finished fourteenth in the championship without a podium.

Return to Superbike
He joined the Renegade Ducati Koji team and was in contention for the championship until the final round, despite several mechanical failures.

For  Haga joined Yamaha Motor Italia, Yamaha's factory supported team. He finished third in the championship and became the first rider to win a dry weather race having failed to lap fast enough to qualify for 'Superpole'.

In , he was again Yamaha's leading man. After 7 rounds he was 2nd in the championship to Troy Bayliss, without having won a race. At round 7 in Brno he took pole, but finished third and fourth in the two races, having been passed by Michel Fabrizio on the last lap of both. At round 8 in the UK, he took his first win of the year. At Round 9 at Lausitzring in Germany Nori picked up two second places after battling for the win in both races. The first race was won by his good friend Yukio Kagayama of Alstare Corona Suzuki and the second by Britain's James Toseland of Winston Ten Kate Honda, who had been his main rival for 2nd place in the championship. For the third season in a row, Haga came third.

Haga finished 2nd in the riders championship, 2 points behind Toseland - a double win in the final round at Magny-Cours being just not enough.

Haga won seven races during the season, with wins at Valencia, Monza, and Magny-Cours, as well as doubles at the Nurburgring and Vallelunga. However, this was only good enough for 3rd in the final standings behind (the winless) Corser and Xerox Ducati's title winner, Troy Bayliss.

In , he joined the factory-backed Ducati Xerox Team to replace the retiring Bayliss, winning his first race at Phillip Island, and taking an early championship lead.  However, a severe high-side crash during Race 2 in Round 9 at Donington Park put his pursuit of the 2009 championship in doubt.  With Haga out of race 2, Ben Spies took victory and reduced Haga's points lead to 14. In the  Superbike World Championship Noriyuki Haga joined the PATA RACING TEAM APRILIA (Satellite Team) as a solo rider on the Aprillia RSV4 Factory bike.

British Superbike Championship
Haga signed with the Swan Yamaha British Superbike Team for the 2012 season alongside reigning 2011 BSB champion Tommy Hill. Haga marked his BSB debut at the first race of Round 1 at Brands Hatch with a 13th-place finish (Race 2 was cancelled due to extreme track conditions caused by pouring rain). In Round 8 at Cadwell Park, Haga broke his collarbone in a big high-side during free practice and was ruled out for the weekend. After suffering with nagging injuries for most of the season, Haga eventually finished 8th overall. On 16 September 2013, it was announced that Haga would be returning to BSB with Paul Bird Motorsport riding a Kawasaki ZX-10R for the final 3 rounds of the season.

Career summary
 World Superbike career
 1996: 22nd in World Superbike Championship with Yamaha (2 race as wild-card, 1 podium)
 1997: 13th in World Superbike Championship with Yamaha (4 race as replacement rider, 1 win, 3 podiums, 72 points)
 1998: 6th in World Superbike Championship with Yamaha WSBK Team (5 wins, 7 podiums, 258 points)
 1999: 7th in World Superbike Championship with Yamaha WSBK Team (1 win, 2 podiums, 196 points)
 2000: 2nd in World Superbike Championship with Yamaha WSBK Team (4 wins, 11 podiums, 334 points)
 2002: 4th in World Superbike Championship with PlayStation 2-FGF Aprilia (7 podiums, 278 points)
 2004: 3rd in World Superbike Championship with Renegade Ducati Koji (6 wins, 9 podiums, 299 points)
 2005: 3rd in World Superbike Championship with Yamaha Motor Italia WSB (2 wins, 10 podiums, 271 points)
 2006: 3rd in World Superbike Championship with Yamaha Motor Italia WSB (1 win, 11 podiums, 326 points)
 2007: 2nd in World Superbike Championship with Yamaha Motor Italia WSB (6 wins, 15 podiums, 413 points)
 2008: 3rd in World Superbike Championship with Yamaha Motor Italia WSB (7 wins, 11 podiums, 327 points)
 2009: 2nd in World Superbike Championship with Ducati Xerox Team (8 wins, 19 podiums, 456 points)
 2010: 6th in World Superbike Championship with Ducati Xerox Team (2 wins, 6 podiums, 258 points)
 2011: 8th in World Superbike Championship with Pata Aprilia Team (0 wins, 4 podiums, 176 points)
 500cc/MotoGP career
 1998: 20th in 500cc World Championship with Yamaha Racing Team (1 race as wild-card, 1 podium, 16 points)
 2001: 14th in 500cc World Championship with Red Bull Yamaha WCM (15 race, 59 points)
 2003: 14th in MotoGP World Championship with Alice Aprilia Racing (16 race, 47 points)
 Others
 1996: Won Suzuka 8 Hours endurance race with Yamaha (with Colin Edwards)
 1997: Won Japanese Superbike Championship with Yamaha
 2012: 8th in British Superbike Championship with Swan Yamaha (0 wins, 1 podium, 160 points)
 2015: 7th in Asia Road Race SS600 Championship with Team Kagayama Suzuki ASIA (Suzuki GSX-R600)

Career statistics

Superbike World Championship

Races by year
(key) (Races in bold indicate pole position) (Races in italics indicate fastest lap)

Grand Prix motorcycle racing

Races by year
(key) (Races in bold indicate pole position, races in italics indicate fastest lap)

British Superbike Championship

Races by year
(key) (Races in bold indicate pole position) (Races in italics indicate fastest lap)

References

External links

NKI41.com – Noriyuki Haga Official Website

1975 births
Living people
Doping cases in motorcycle racing
Sportspeople from Nagoya
Japanese motorcycle racers
MotoGP World Championship riders
Superbike World Championship riders
500cc World Championship riders
British Superbike Championship riders